The Tulsa Golden Hurricane football statistical leaders are individual statistical leaders of the Tulsa Golden Hurricane football program in various categories, including passing, rushing, receiving, total offense, defensive stats, and kicking. Within those areas, the lists identify single-game, single-season, and career leaders. The Golden Hurricane represent the University of Tulsa in the NCAA's American Athletic Conference.

Although Tulsa began competing in intercollegiate football in 1895, the school's official record book considers the "modern era" to have begun in 1941. Records from before this year are often incomplete and inconsistent, and they are generally not included in these lists.

These lists are dominated by more recent players for several reasons:
 Since 1941, seasons have increased from 10 games to 11 and then 12 games in length.
 The NCAA didn't allow freshmen to play varsity football until 1972 (with the exception of the World War II years), allowing players to have four-year careers.
 Bowl games only began counting toward single-season and career statistics in 2002. The Golden Hurricane have played in 10 bowl games since this decision, giving many recent players an extra game to accumulate statistics.

However, the passing and receiving lists also see many entries during the 1961–1968 tenure of head coach Glenn Dobbs, whose teams led the NCAA in passing yards five times in an era before today's modern spread offenses.

These lists are updated through the end of the 2016 season. Note that the Tulsa official record book does not include any information for some of these statistics.

Passing

Passing yards

Passing touchdowns

Rushing

Rushing yards

Rushing touchdowns

Receiving

Receptions

Receiving yards

Receiving touchdowns

Total offense
Total offense is the sum of passing and rushing statistics. It does not include receiving or returns.

Total offense yards

Total touchdowns

Defense

Interceptions

Tackles

Sacks

Kicking

Field goals made

References

Tulsa